The Battle of Toropets was fought during the Livonian War, between Polish–Lithuanian Commonwealth and the Tsardom of Russia in September 20, 1580. Polish-Lithuanian Commonwealth forces under the command of Janusz Zbaraski defeated the Russian forces commanded by Dimitrij Cheremisov and Grigorij Nashchokin.

Notes

References

Kupisz, Dariusz. Psków 1581-1582, Bellona, (2006). .
Plewczyński, Marek. Wojny i wojskowość polska w XVI wieku Tom III. Lata 1576-1599. Infort Editions, (2013). 

Toropets 1580
Toropets 1580
Toropets 1580
Toropets
1580 in Europe
Military history of Russia